The 2020 California wildfire season, part of the 2020 Western United States wildfire season, was a record-setting year of wildfires in California.  By the end of the year, 9,917 fires had burned , more than 4% of the state's roughly 100 million acres of land, making 2020 the largest wildfire season recorded in California's modern history (according to the California Department of Forestry and Fire Protection), though roughly equivalent to the pre-1800 levels which averaged around 4.4 million acres yearly and up to 12 million in peak years. California's August Complex fire has been described as the first "gigafire", burning over 1 million acres across seven counties, an area larger than the state of Rhode Island. The fires destroyed over 10,000 structures and cost over $12.079 billion (2020 USD) in damages, including over $10 billion in property damage and $2.079 billion in fire suppression costs. The intensity of the fire season has been attributed to a combination of more than a century of poor forest management and higher temperatures resulting from climate change.

On August 18, Governor Gavin Newsom declared a state of emergency, and on August 19, 2020, reported that the state was battling 367 known fires, many sparked by intense thunderstorms on August 16–17 caused by moisture from the remnants of Tropical Storm Fausto. Response and evacuations were complicated by a historic heatwave and the ongoing COVID-19 pandemic.  On August 22, President Donald Trump issued a major disaster declaration (DR-4558), which provides Individual Assistance and/or Public Assistance.

In early September 2020, a combination of a record-breaking heat wave and strong katabatic winds, (including the Jarbo, Diablo, and Santa Ana) caused explosive fire growth.  The August Complex became California's largest recorded wildfire. The Creek Fire expanded in the Big Creek drainage area, temporarily trapping hundreds of campers near the Mammoth Pool Reservoir. The North Complex explosively grew in size as the winds fanned it westward, threatening the city of Oroville, triggering mass evacuations, and causing 16 fatalities.

Governor Newsom's request for a federal disaster declaration for six major wildfires was approved on October 17 after having been rejected the previous day.

On November 10, 2020, the National Interagency Coordination Center (NICC) reported that there were around 3,400 firefighters plus personnel fighting the wildfires in the United States.

Early outlook
Early in the year, there was a concern for the 2020 fire season to potentially be prolonged and especially grave, due to the unusually dry months of January and February, one of the driest such periods of any calendar year on record. On March 22, a state of emergency was declared by California Governor Gavin Newsom due to a mass die-off of trees throughout the state, potentially increasing the risk of wildfires. However, throughout March and April, rain began to consistently fall in the state, which alleviated the drought conditions. Despite this, Northern California was still expected to have severe wildfire conditions due to the moderate or severe drought conditions in the area, whereas Central and Southern California were expected to have serious fire conditions later in the year due to the late wet season and precipitation.

On June 18, climate scientist Daniel Swain predicted  the 2020 Arizona wildfire season was a sign of what was to come in California, due to similar drought and weather conditions between Arizona and Northern California.

Seasonal fire risk

The year 2020 was the largest wildfire year recorded in California history, according to the California Department of Forestry and Fire Protection. From a historical perspective, the average annual acres burned prior to 1850 were probably significantly larger than years since reliable fire records began. Scott Stephens, a professor of fire science at UC Berkeley, estimated that prior to 1850, about  burned yearly, in fires that lasted for months. Activity peaked roughly every 30 years, with up to  burning during peak years. The indigenous peoples of California historically set controlled burns and allowed natural fires to run their course.

The peak of the wildfire season usually occurs between July and November when hot, dry winds are most frequent. The wildfire season typically does not end until the first significant rainstorm of autumn arrives, which is usually around October in Northern California, and early November in Southern California.

As wildfire becomes more frequent, the wildland–urban interface has increasingly become more dangerous when it comes to property damage and risk to life.

Causes

Land development and forest management 

Scientists believe that, prior to development, California fires regularly burned significantly more acreage than has been seen in recent history. Wildfires have been aggressively suppressed in recent years, resulting in a buildup of fuel, increasing the risk of large uncontrollable fires. There is broad scientific consensus that there should be more controlled burning of forests in California in order to reduce fire risk. A 2020 ProPublica investigation blames a combination of climate change and a history of insufficient controlled burning for the increase in "megafires." A sharp increase in the population and development of fire-prone areas has also contributed to the increase in flammable tinder.

Climate change 

Climate change increases the temperature of wildfires in California, the risk for drought, and potentially also the frequency of such events. David Romps, director of the Berkeley Atmospheric Sciences Center summarizes the situation as follows: "To cut to the chase: Were the heat wave and the lightning strikes and the dryness of the vegetation affected by global warming? Absolutely yes. Were they made significantly hotter, more numerous, and drier because of global warming? Yes, likely yes, and yes."

Similarly, Friederike Otto, acting director of the University of Oxford Environmental Change Institute states, "There is absolutely no doubt that the extremely high temperatures are higher than they would have been without human-induced climate change. A huge body of attribution literature demonstrates now that climate change is an absolute game-changer when it comes to heat waves, and California won't be the exception." Susan Clark, director of the Sustainability Initiative at the University at Buffalo argues, "This is climate change. This increased intensity and frequency of temperatures and heat waves are part of the projections for the future. [...] There is going to be more morbidity and mortality [from heat.] There are going to be more extremes."

The National Interagency Fire Center's (NFIC) National Interagency Coordination (NICC) reported that monthly outlooks for the entire country will still drive wildfires across the country but especially California. The main drivers through fall and winter seasons will be La Nina, and drought conditions are going to continue through California, causing the wildfires to continue. The shift will start from Northern California to Southern California as precipitation will lessen the impact of wildfires across northern California.

Arson 
In August 2020, a suspect was charged by the Monterey County Sheriff with arson relating to the Dolan Fire; however, this has not been officially determined as the cause of the fire. In April 2021, another suspect, already arrested and charged for the murder of a woman, was charged with arson relating to the Markley Fire, one of the wildfires involving in the LNU Lightning Complex fires; according to authorities, the fire was set to cover up the aforementioned murder. Arson has also been suspected as the cause of the Ranch 2 Fire in Los Angeles County.

List of wildfires

See also

 List of California wildfires
 August 2020 California lightning wildfires
 Emergency evacuation procedures during the COVID-19 pandemic
 Western US wildfire trends
 2020 Western United States wildfire season

References

Further reading

External links

 Current fire information  — California Department of Forestry and Fire Protection (CAL FIRE)
 SDSC WiFire Interactive Map — San Diego Supercomputer Center
 Active Fire map of United States at nwcg.gov

 
Articles containing video clips
Effects of climate change
California, 2020
2020
Climate change in the United States